Tang-e Chowgan-e Sofla-ye Dar Shuri (also Romanized as Tang-e Chowgān-e ‘Olyā-ye Dar Shūrī; also known as Tang-e Chowgān-e ‘Olyā-ye Darreh Shūrī) is a village in Shapur Rural District, in the Central District of Kazerun County, Fars Province, Iran. At the 2006 census, its population was 249, in 52 families.

References 

Populated places in Kazerun County